The Langfjorden is a fjord in Møre og Romsdal county, Norway. The fjord then continues to the east to the village of Eidsvåg in Molde Municipality.

The fjord's two arms, Eresfjorden at east end and Rødvenfjorden at the west end are oriented to the south. The fjord is crossed by the Åfarnes–Sølsnes Ferry, as part of County Road 64. The Langfjord Tunnel is a proposed undersea tunnel that would replace the ferry. The village of Mittet in Rauma lies on the south shore of the fjord.

The waves killed 32 people and destroyed 168 buildings, 196 boats, large amounts of forest, and roads and boat landings.

See also
 List of Norwegian fjords

References

Rauma, Norway
Molde
Fjords of Møre og Romsdal